Paul William "Tom" Santschi (October 24, 1880 – April 9, 1931) was an American leading man and character actor of the silent film era.

Personal life
Santschi was born in Missouri to Paul Santschi, a Swiss immigrant, and his wife, Margaret Kern, a native of Louisville, Kentucky. The family later moved to Kokomo, Indiana. Paul left home to pursue a career in moviemaking (as Tom Santschi), and at the time he registered for the draft in 1918, he was working for the Goldwyn Motion Picture Corporation in Fort Lee, New Jersey.

Career
Santschi acted in over 245 films during the period 1907–1931, and directed 28 films during 1914–1916. He wrote one screenplay in 1914. A 1915 two-reeler, In the King's Service, in which he starred with Marion Warner, surfaced at a yard sale in Maine, and was shown along with The Spoilers (1914) at a Northeast Historic Film Festival at Bucksport, Maine in 2002.

Partial filmography

Actor

Director

References

External links

Findagrave.com

1880 births
1931 deaths
American male stage actors
American male silent film actors
Burials at Hollywood Forever Cemetery
Male actors from Indiana
Film directors from Indiana
20th-century American male actors
People from Crystal City, Missouri
Male actors from Missouri
Film directors from Missouri